Foxbridge (GB), foaled in 1930, was an English Thoroughbred racehorse by Foxlaw out of Bridgemount by Bridge of Earn. His race record was 18 starts for 1 win, 3 seconds and 4 thirds.

In 1935, the English stallion Foxbridge was purchased for £2,625 by Seton Otway and imported into New Zealand. Here he  was a very successful sire at Trelawney Stud near Cambridge, New Zealand. This remarkably consistent horse was New Zealand's most successful sire and brood-mare sire for 11 consecutive seasons. Twice he was the British Empire's champion sire.

His female offspring were to produce five Melbourne Cup winners: Hiraji, Foxzami, Macdougal, Hi Jinx and Silver Knight. Foxbridge's potency was illustrated at Ellerslie Racecourse on Boxing Day 1944, when his progeny won six races on an eight-race card.

He was inducted into the New Zealand Racing Hall of Fame in 2008.

See also

 Thoroughbred racing in New Zealand

Reference list

Champion Thoroughbred Sires of New Zealand
New Zealand Racing Hall of Fame horses
Racehorses bred in the United Kingdom
Racehorses trained in the United Kingdom
New Zealand Thoroughbred sires
Sport in Cambridge, New Zealand
Thoroughbred family 14-b
Chefs-de-Race